Christine Love is a Filipino singer. She received Aliw Awards Best Female Artist award on 2009 and Best in a Live performance in a concert in 2010. She has released several albums under VIVA records.

.(wrong link) She released her album Happy on 2009 featuring the cover song "Happy" originally by Michael Jackson.

Discography

Studio album
Happy (Viva Records)
Until The End Of Time (Viva Records)

References

External links

Living people
Singers from Manila
21st-century Filipino women singers
Year of birth missing (living people)